Gulay Tofig gizi Zeynalli (born 10 June 1988, Baku) is an Azerbaijani singer.

Biography 
Gulay Zeynalli was born on June 10, 1988, in Baku. She graduated from Azerbaijan National Conservatory Music College. Her music teacher is Arif Babayev.

Gulay is participant in “Xalq ulduzu”, a television singing competition in Azerbaijan.

Discography

Singles 
 Röyamdasan (2011)
 Dinə bilmədim (2011)
 Məhəbbət dil açanda (2011)
 Biləsən (2011)
 Biz necə unudaq bir-birimizi (2011)
 Xatırla məni (2011)
 Gəlməz bir daha (2011)
 Bayramınız mübarək (2011)
 Mən səninləyəm (2014) 
 Sevgilim (2015) 
 Oyna-oyna (2016) 
 Sənsizləmişəm (2016) 
 Ben yoruldum hayat (2016) 
 Sənli günlərimə bağışla məni (2016) 
 Sən olmasan (2017) 
 Böyük eşq (2019) 
 Doya-doya (2020) 
 Elə bil (2021)

Albums 
 Röyamdasan (2011)

References

Links 
 

1988 births
Living people
21st-century Azerbaijani women singers
Musicians from Baku
Azerbaijani women pop singers